The Divide trilogy is a fantasy young adult novel trilogy by Elizabeth Kay, which takes place in an alternate universe. The three books are The Divide (2002), Back to The Divide (2005), and Jinx on The Divide (2006). The first novel was originally published by the small press publisher Chicken House (now a division of Scholastic), with subsequent volumes published by Scholastic, which also reprinted the first novel. The books have been translated into French, German, Spanish, Finnish, Chinese, Japanese, Portuguese, Italian, Romanian and Dutch. Interior illustrations are by Ted Dewan.

The Divide

Plot summary
A thirteen-year-old boy, Felix Sanders, has a life-threatening heart condition. While his family is vacationing in Costa Rica at a place called the Divide, the point where water flows to both the Pacific and Atlantic oceans, he passes out and he finds himself in alternate world, where the Earth's mythical creatures are real and humans are a legend. He sets off on a journey with residents of this world to cure his illness and get home. He meets a creature named Betony, a tangle-child (elf) who later becomes his lifelong best friend.

Back to the Divide

Plot summary
Snakeweed, a character from the first novel who came from the alternate world, wants to return home, but in order to do so, he needs a spell hidden in Felix's notebook. In order to obtain the spell, Snakeweed turns Felix's parents into stone. The curse spreads, and Felix must head back across the Divide to find the counter charm and save the Earth. In this book, old friends return afresh and new enemies are discovered. A crisis almost mirrors the one in the real world in the alternate world: the king and queen are missing. Felix must now race against time in an attempt to rescue BOTH worlds, something not easily done, considering the risks.

Jinx on the Divide

Plot summary
A bully, Rhino, at Felix's school accidentally releases a brandee (djinn/genie) from a lamp Felix obtained from across the Divide. The djinn demands to be returned home and to be given a solid form. Felix and Betony (who is spending Christmas with Felix across the Divide with Nimplenap, Betony's flying carpet), return to that world. Meanwhile, inside the lamp, Rhino has found a box that will grant him any of his desires, in exchange for  hearing Rhino say the magic words that could destroy both worlds.

References
The Divide, Chicken House 2005, 
Back to the Divide, Scholastic Paperbacks 2007, 
Jinx on the Divide,  Scholastic Books 2007, 
"The Horn Book Guide to Children's and Young Adult Books" Vol. 17, Issues 1–2, July–December 2005, p. 76 (review)
"Bookseller Children's Buyer's Guide" 2006, p. 38 (review)

External links 
Jinx on the Divide at the Scholastic Books website
Author's web-site

Fantasy books by series
Fantasy novel trilogies
Novels about parallel universes